Chicoo syrup was first developed in Chico, California in 1935. Since then the brand has fallen into relative obscurity but can still be found at certain specialty stores around North America.

Chicoo is a desert syrup often used on ice creams or white jelly though there is a small following of people who use the syrup as an aphrodisiac.

References
Dwight, Jim. North America's Favorite Deserts.
Scott, Pamela. The Story of Chicoo''.

American brands
Brand name desserts